Phil Decker is a fictional character in Heinz Werner Höber's Jerry Cotton novels. He is Cotton's sidekick and a fellow FBI agent.

Subsequently, he appeared in the films Manhattan Night of Murder (1965), Tread Softly (1965) and six other films starring George Nader as Jerry Cotton. In all these films he was portrayed by Heinz Weiss.

In 2010's ironic revival film Jerry Cotton he was played by the comedian Christian Ulmen.

External links
 Jerry Cotton films on IMDB

Literary characters introduced in 1954
Characters in novels of the 20th century
Fictional Federal Bureau of Investigation personnel